Eremophila crassifolia, commonly known as thick-leaved emubush or trim emubush, is a flowering plant in the figwort family, Scrophulariaceae and is endemic to an area extending from New South Wales through Victoria to southern parts of South Australia. It is a low, spreading shrub with clustered leaves and bell-shaped, usually mauve-coloured flowers.

Description
Its leaves are densely clustered and overlapping, thick, folded lengthwise and egg-shaped to almost round.

The flowers are borne singly in leaf axils on a very short stalk. The petals are usually lilac-coloured, sometimes white on the outside, and are white inside with lilac spots. The outer surface of the tube and petal lobes are glabrous except for the lower petal lobe which has prominent hairs on its upper surface. The inside of the tube is filled with long, soft hairs. Two of the 4 stamens are fully enclosed in the petal tube while the other 2 extend slightly beyond it.

Taxonomy and naming
The species was first formally described by Ferdinand von Mueller in 1859 and the description was published in Papers and Proceedings of the Royal Society of Tasmania. In 1870, Mueller changed the name to Pholidia crassifolia and again to the present name in 1882. The specific epithet (crassifolium) is derived from the Latin words crassus meaning "thick", "fat" or "stout" and folium meaning "leaf".

Distribution and habitat
Thick-leaved emubush is widespread and common in southern parts of South Australia including the Eyre Peninsula, and eastwards to western Victoria.

Conservation status
Eremophila crassifolia is regarded as "not at risk".

Use in horticulture
This eremophila is one of the hardiest of the genus and can survive frost and extended drought. It strikes readily from cuttings and will form a dense colony if allowed to sucker.

References

crassifolia
Plants described in 1859
Flora of New South Wales
Flora of South Australia
Flora of Victoria (Australia)
Taxa named by Ferdinand von Mueller